Makuakateni is a village in the Dhenkanal district of Odisha state in India.

References 

Villages in Dhenkanal district